James Clutton (1869 – 1943) was an English footballer. He made 92 appearances for Burslem Port Vale; 27 of these were friendlies, 29 were in the Football League and 22 in the Midland League.

Career
Clutton joined Burslem Port Vale in the summer of 1889. His appearances were rare until September 1891, when he broke into the first team at the Athletic Ground. He was a member of the side that shared the North Staffordshire Staffordshire Charity Challenge Cup in 1891 and won the Staffordshire Challenge Cup in 1892. He featured in the 1892–93 campaign, in what was Vale's first season in the Second Division of the Football League. He featured nine times in the 1893–94 campaign, though his career effectively ended when he broke a leg in October 1893.

Career statistics
Source:

Honours
Port Vale
North Staffordshire Staffordshire Charity Challenge Cup: 1891 (shared)
Staffordshire Challenge Cup: 1892

References

1869 births
1943 deaths
Footballers from Staffordshire
English footballers
Association football fullbacks
Port Vale F.C. players
Midland Football League players
English Football League players